Provincial Highway 31 is a  provincial highway in Taoyuan City, Taiwan. An elevated section of the Taiwan High Speed Rail viaduct and under-tunnel acts as a median for most of the highway, except when the highway is near THSR Taoyuan Station and when the highway is near and on its  southern terminus. The highway serves the THSR Taoyuan Station.

Major intersections

References

External links

Highways in Taiwan